The 2013–14 Western Sydney Wanderers FC season was the club's second season since its establishment in 2012. The club participated in the A-League for the second time, as well as the AFC Champions League for the first time.

Season overview
On 30 April, Western Sydney Wanderers announced the release of four players, Dino Kresinger, Tarek Elrich, Joey Gibbs and Rocky Visconte. Labinot Haliti and Jason Trifiro signed one year extensions to their initial one-year contract on 1 May, as did Tahj Minniecon on 9 May. On 20 May, forward Tomi Jurić signed a two-year deal with the club. On 1 July, defender Dean Heffernan signed a one-year deal with the club. On 31 July, Western Sydney Wanderers agreed on the transfer of midfielder Reece Caira to Wellington Phoenix FC. On 6 August, forward Brendon Šantalab signed a one-year deal with the club. On 1 September, Mark Bridge extended his contract with Western Sydney Wanderers for a further three years, until 2017. On 5 September, Mateo Poljak signed 2-year extension with the club, until 2016. On 1 October, Matthew Špiranović signed a one-year deal with the club.

On 12 October, Western Sydney Wanderers played their first match of the A-League season drawing against Central Coast Mariners 1–1 with new signing Jurić scoring the equalising goal on the 87th minute. On 20 October, Wanderers drew their first home game 1–1 against Wellington Phoenix with a goal from Polenz. On 26 October, Wanderers defeated Sydney 0–2 at a sold-out Sydney Football Stadium, winning the first Sydney Derby match of the season with goals from La Rocca and Ono. On 1 November, Wanderers defeated Adelaide United 2–1 with Jurić scoring both goals to win the match. On 8 November, Wanderers continued their unbeaten run of the season with a 0–1 win against Melbourne Heart, Cole provided the only goal of the match. On 13 November, following an impressive start to the season, forward Brendon Šantalab extended his initial one-year contract with the club for another two-years, until 2016. On 16 November, Wanderers defeated Melbourne Victory 1–0 with a goal from Bridge. On 22 November, Wanderers lost their first game of the season 3–1 against Brisbane Roar with Šantalab scored the only goal for the Wanderers. On 1 December, Wanderers drew 0–0 Wellington Phoenix. On 7 December, Wanderers drew 1–1 at home against Melbourne Heart with Mooy leveling the score on the 44th minute. On 9 December, forward Labinot Haliti signed a two-season contract extension until 2016. For the 2014 AFC Champions League Wanderers were drawn in Group H on 10 December, alongside Guizhou Renhe of China, Ulsan Hyundai of South Korea and Kawasaki Frontale of Japan. On 14 December, Wanderers continued the winnings ways with a 0–1 away win, courtesy of Bridge, against Newcastle Jets. On 22 December, Ante Čović and Shannon Cole re-signed with the club for a further one and two years respectively. Wanderers picked up their sixth win of the season after a 2–0 win against Central Coast Mariners at Pirtek Stadium on 23 December. On 28 December, Wanderers drew 1–1 with Melbourne Victory. Substitute Šantalab appeared to have given Wanderers the three points with a goal only minutes after coming on until a 94th-minute goal from Melbourne Victory.

On 1 January 2014, Wanderers lost their first match of the new year against Wellington Phoenix with a 1–3 score. A 62nd-minute goal from Bridge was not enough to secure the home win for Wanderers with Wellington Phoenix scoring three goals late into the game. On 11 January, Wanderers won the second Sydney Derby 1–0 in front of the biggest crowd of the season at Pirtek Stadium after a goal from substitute Šantalab on the 86th minute of the match. On 14 January, Wanderers lost 3–1 to Melbourne Victory in a rescheduled match due to Melbourne Victory's involvement in the 2014 AFC Champions League. Jurić scored the only goal for an under-strength Wanderers. Wanderers remained in second position in the league despite a 1–0 away loss to Adelaide United, after a controversial fourth-minute goal on 19 January. On 26 January, Wanderers defeated Perth Glory 3–1 in their first clash of the season. Goals from Šantalab and Mooy put Wanderers ahead in the first half, and a penalty kick scored by Bridge on the 71st minute ensured the win. On 31 January, Wanderers drew with Newcastle Jest 2–2; a set-piece goal from Mooy before half-time leveled the score and a goal from captain Michael Beauchamp just after the hour mark looked to have claimed a win before a last minute goal meant the points were shared. On 3 February, Golgol Mebrahtu and Daniel Mullen were signed to the club until the end of the 2015–16 season. Forward Mebrahtu was transferred from Melbourne Heart and defender signed from Chinese Super League club Dalian Aerbin. On 5 February, Antony Golec was signed to the club until the end of the season from Adelaide United. Since there were no positions remaining in Wanderers' A-League squad, Golec, along with Mebrahtu and Mullen were only eligible to participate in the club's AFC Champions League campaign until the end of the season. On 7 February, Wanderers secured a 1–1 draw at home against first placed Brisbane Roar. A late 85th-minute goal from Haliti clinched the crucial point. On 26 February, Wanderers Asian debut ended in defeat, with the team losing 1–3 at home to Ulsan Hyundai. A first-minute goal by Šantalab was cancelled out by sloppy defending as Ulsan Hyundai scored three unanswered goals to take the match. On 5 March, following a season-ending injured incurred by Tahj Minniecon, Golgol Mebrahtu was added to the Wanderers squad as an injury replacement. On 8 March, Wanderers played their third derby match of the season in front of a sold-out crowd of 40,285 fans at Allianz Stadium. After a dominating first half performance against their fierce rivals, Wanderers took the lead via a Shinji Ono goal early in the second half before falling 3–1 to Sydney FC. On 12 March, Wanderers earned their first ever win in the AFC Champions League with a 1–0 away win against Guizhou Renhe at the Guiyang Olympic Sports Center. The 10th-minute goal came after Bridge reacted quickly to poke the ball into the back of the net from close, after an initial save from Guizhou’s keeper. On 15 March, Wanderers dropped to third on the A-League table after a 0–0 draw against Adelaide United at home. On 18 March, Daniel Mullen was added to the Wanderers A-League squad as injury replacement for Golgol Mebrahtu. On 19 March, Wanderers secured a 1–0 win over Kawasaki Frontale in the AFC Champions League, with a third-minute goal from Haliti. On 23 March, Wanderers defeated Perth Glory 3–0, with Polenz, Bridge and Jurić all finding the back of the net during the win. On 29 March, Wanderers lost 2–1 to Central Coast Mariners. Topor-Stanley's equalising goal looked to have secured Wanderers a point until the contest was decided on the 90th minute. On 1 April, Wanderers fell short away from home 2–1 against Kawasaki Frontale in their fourth AFC Champions League match, with Haliti scoring Wanderers only goal. On 5 April, Wanderers and Brisbane Roar shared the points in a 1–1 draw, with Jurić finding the back of the net. On 12 April, Wanderers secured second place with a 2–3 away win to Melbourne Heart in their final match of the A-League regular season. Topor-Stanley, Šantalab and Hersi all shared in the spoils.

Players

Squad information

From youth squad

Transfers in

Transfers out

Technical staff

Statistics

Squad statistics

Pre-season and friendlies

Competitions

Overall

A-League

League table

Results summary

Results by round

Matches

Finals Series

AFC Champions League

Group stage

Round of 16

Quarter-finals

Semi-finals

Final

See also
 2013–14 Western Sydney Wanderers W-League season

Awards
 Player of the Week (Round 3) – Shinji Ono
 Player of the Week (Round 4) – Tomi Jurić
 Player of the Week (Round 11) – Tomi Jurić
 Player of the Week (Round 14) – Youssouf Hersi

References

External links
 Official Website

Western
Western Sydney Wanderers FC seasons